are the bilateral and diplomatic relations between Japan and the United Kingdom.

History 
The history of the relationship between Japan and England began in 1600 with the arrival of William Adams (Adams the Pilot, Miura Anjin), (the first of very few non-Japanese samurai) on the shores of Kyushu at Usuki in Ōita Prefecture. During the Sakoku period (1641–1853), there were no formal relations between the two countries. The Dutch served as intermediaries. The treaty of 1854 began formal diplomatic ties, which improved to become a formal alliance 1902–1922.  The British dominions pressured Britain to end the alliance.  Relations deteriorated rapidly in the 1930s, over the Japanese invasions of Manchuria and China, and the cutoff of oil supplies in 1941. Japan declared war in December 1941 and seized Hong Kong, British Borneo (with its oil), and Malaya, causing the two nations to engage in a bloody conflict for the next four years. With overwhelming forces the Japanese sank much of the British fleet and forced the surrender of Singapore, capturing many prisoners. They reached the outskirts of India until being pushed back. Relations improved in the 1950s-1970s, and as memories of the conflict faded, became warm. On 3 May 2011, British Foreign Secretary William Hague said that Japan is "one of [Britain]'s closest partners in Asia".

Chronology of Japanese–British relations

Beginning
1577. Richard Wylles writes about the people, customs and manners of Giapan in the History of Travel published in London. 
1580. Richard Hakluyt advises the first English merchants to find a new trade route via the Northwest passage to trade wool for silver with Japan (sending two Barque ships, the George piloted by Arthur Pet and William by Charles Jackman) which returned unsuccessfully by Christmas the same year.
1587. Two young Japanese men named Christopher and Cosmas sailed on a Spanish galleon to California, where their ship was captured by Thomas Cavendish. Cavendish brought the two Japanese men with him to England where they spent approximately three years before going again with him on his last expedition to the South Atlantic where they were heading to Japan to begin trade relations. They are the first known Japanese men to have set foot in the British Isles.
1593. Richard Hawkins leaves England on board the Dainty in a bid to discover the 'Iſlands of Japan' via the Magellan Strait in 1594, the very route William Adams would take himself in 1599. Hawkins however was captured by the Spanish at Peru, only returning in 1603 after a ransom of £12,000 was paid by his mother for his release.

Early

1600. William Adams, a seaman from Gillingham, Kent, was the first English adventurer to arrive in Japan. Acting as an advisor to the Tokugawa shōgun, he was renamed Miura Anjin, granted a house and land, and spent the rest of his life in his adopted country. He also became one of the first English samurai.
1605. John Davis, the famous English explorer, was killed by Japanese pirates off the coast of Thailand, thus becoming the first known Englishman to be killed by a Japanese.

1613. Following an invitation from William Adams in Japan, the English captain John Saris arrived at Hirado Island in the ship Clove with the intent of establishing a trading factory. Adams and Saris travelled to Suruga Province where they met with Tokugawa Ieyasu at his principal residence in September before moving on to Edo where they met Ieyasu's son Hidetada. During that meeting, Hidetada gave Saris two varnished suits of armour for King James I, today housed in the Tower of London. On their way back, they visited Tokugawa once more, who conferred trading privileges on the English through a Red Seal permit giving them "free licence to abide, buy, sell and barter" in Japan. The English party headed back to Hirado Island on 9 October 1613. However, during the ten-year activity of the company between 1613 and 1623, apart from the first ship (Clove in 1613), only three other English ships brought cargoes directly from London to Japan.
1623. The Amboyna massacre was perpetrated by the Dutch East India Company. After the incident England closed its commercial base at Hirado Island, now in Nagasaki Prefecture, without notifying Japan. After this, the relationship ended for more than two centuries.
1625. A number of documents including the Iaponian Charter, are the first published translated Japanese documents into English by Samuel Purchas

Sakoku
1639. Tokugawa Iemitsu announced his Sakoku policy. Only the Dutch Republic was permitted to retain limited trade rights.
1640. Uriemon Eaton the son of William Eaton (a worker at the EIC post in Japan) and Kamezo (a Japanese woman), becomes the first Japanese to join Academia in England as a scholar at Trinity College, Cambridge.

1646. Robert Dudley publishes a detailed original map of Japan and Yezo in his Secrets of the Sea treatise, based on the Mercator Projection
1668. 25 February. Henry Oldenburg addresses the Royal Society on the letters of Richard Cocks, particularly noting English trading privileges from the time of Cocks, striking new interest in trade with Japan in England. Based on this new interest, surviving member of the original factory William Eaton (fl.1613-1668), was contacted in order to reopen trade between England and Japan.
1670. John Ogilby publishes the first translation of Atlas Japanensis in London, reprinted in 1671 & 1673
1670. The EIC factories are set up at modern day Taiwan (1670-1685) after Koxinqa invites the British to set up a factory
1672. Tongking EIC factory begins operations (along with 'Tywan') with the intention by the British to be used as bases for further trade with Japan
1673. An English ship named Returner visited Nagasaki harbour with factors from the first Hirado factory, and asked for a renewal of trading relations. But the Edo shogunate refused after Dutch prompting. The government cited the withdrawal 50 years earlier, and found it unacceptable that the English king had married the Portuguese Catherine of Braganza, claiming the English to favour the Roman Catholic Church.

1683. Molly Verney begins learning Japanning as a handicraft in London
1703.  James Cunninghame FRS attempts to initiate trade with Japan from Cochinchina and the chaplain James Pound in his service notes of VOC activity in Japan until they are attacked by locals in 1705
1713. Daniel Defoe writes of William Adams and his 'famous voyage to Japan' in his satire Memoirs of Count Tariff
1723-25. Hans Sloane send the English court physician Johann Georg Steigerthal to Lemgo to retrieve Engelbert Kaempfer's East Asian collection for his personal library
1727. Johann Caspar Scheuchzer translates and publishes the first edition of Engelbert Kaempfers History of Japan in London
1731. Arthur Dobbs advocates the finding of the North West Passage to 'be able to send a Squadron of ships, Even to force Japan into a Beneficial Treaty of Commerce with Britain.'
1740. Robert Petre, 8th Baron Petre imports the first Camellia japonica into England
1741. The Middleton Expedition is launched to find the Northwest Passage with orders to not engage 'Japanese ships' until the following year should they come across one, with plans halting to trade or settle Japan owing to the circumstances surrounding the Seven Years' War
1745. Thomas Astley reprints by popular demand the Logbook of William Adams in his A New General Collection of Voyages and Travels ; in Europe, Asia, Africa and America under Nippon
1753. 50 Japanese objects from the Sloane collection acquired by Kaempfer during his residence in Japan are bequeathed to the British Museum
1791. James Colnett sails HMS Argonaut from Canton to Japan becoming the second unsuccessful attempt at trade with Sakoku Japan.
1796. William Robert Broughton surveys the North-western coast of Japan, becoming shipwrecked on the coast of Miyako-jima
1808. The Nagasaki Harbour Incident:  enters Nagasaki and lays an unsuccessful ambush on Dutch shipping.
1812. The British whaler HMS Saracen (1812) stopped at Uraga, Kanagawa and took on water, food, and firewood
1813. Thomas Raffles attempts trade with Japan under a British flag to oust Dutch trade monopoly, only for the ooperhoofd to fly the ships under Dutch colours, being rescinded by Governor-General of India on the basis of excessive expense in 1814, also finally being halted in May 1815 by Raffles after the handover of the British colony of Java to the Dutch
1819. The third British ship 'The Brothers' piloted by Captain Peter Gordon, visited Uraga on 17 June seeking to trade with Japan, unsuccessful at Edo to get any treaty
1819. August 3. The first British Whaler HMS Syren begins to exploit the Japan whaling grounds.
1824. 12 English whalers stray ashore looking for food and are apprehended by Aizawa Seishisai leading to new repulsion acts against foreign vessels.
1830. The convict crew of the Cyprus piloted by William Swallow are repelled under the repulsion acts of 1825.
1831. Discussions are held at the British East India Company to hold a base on the Bonin Islands to trade with Japan and the Ryukyuu Archipelago
1832. Otokichi, Kyukichi and Iwakichi, castaways from Aichi Prefecture, crossed the Pacific and were shipwrecked on the west coast of North America. The three Japanese men became famous in the Pacific Northwest and probably inspired Ranald MacDonald to go to Japan. They joined a trading ship to the UK, and later Macau. One of them, Otokichi, took British citizenship and adopted the name John Matthew Ottoson. He later made two visits to Japan as an interpreter for the Royal Navy.
1840. Indian Oak becomes shipwrecked off the coast of Okinawa and a junk is built by Okinawan peoples for the survivors
1842. On the basis of the British naval victory at the First Opium War, the Repel Edicts are renounced by the Bakufu.
1843. Herbert Clifford founds the Loochoo Naval Mission
1850. Bishop Smith arrives at Ryukyu to carry out missionary work
1852. Charles MacFarlane publishes Japan: An Account, Geographical and Historical, from the Earliest Period at which the Islands Composing this Empire Were Known to Europeans, Down to the Present Time, and the Expedition fitted out in the United States, which surmises all known European accounts of Japan and travels to Japan before the Ansei Treaties

1854–1900
1854. 14 October. The first limited Anglo-Japanese Friendship Treaty was signed by Admiral Sir James Stirling and representatives of the Tokugawa shogunate (Bakufu).
1855. In an effort to find the Russian fleet in the Pacific Ocean during the Crimean war, a French-British naval force reached the port of Hakodate, which was open to British ships as a result of the Friendship Treaty of 1854, and sailed further north, seizing the Russian-American Company's possessions on the island of Urup in the Kuril archipelago. The Treaty of Paris (1856) restitutes the island to Russia.
1858. 26 August. The Anglo-Japanese Treaty of Amity and Commerce was signed by the Scotsman Lord Elgin and representatives of the Tokugawa shogunate for Japan, after the Harris Treaty was concluded. Britain obtained extraterritorial rights on Japanese with the British Supreme Court for China and Japan, in Shanghai. A British iron paddle schooner named Enpiroru was presented to the Tokugawa administration by Bruce as a present for the Emperor from Queen Victoria.
1859. Merchant Thomas Blake Glover arrives in Japan via China.
1861. The Tsushima Incident occurs which sees the British repel a Russian naval vessel from invading Tsushima on request from the Bakufu
1861. 5 July. The British legation in Edo was attacked.

1862. The shōgun sends the First Japanese Embassy to Europe, led by Takenouchi Yasunori.
1862. 14 September. The Namamugi Incident occurred within a week of the arrival of Ernest Satow in Japan.
1862–75. British Military Garrison established at Yamate, Yokohama.
1863. The Chōshū Five began their education at University College London under the guidance of Professor Alexander William Williamson.
1863. Bombardment of Kagoshima by the Royal Navy. (Anglo-Satsuma War).
1864. Bombardment of Shimonoseki by Britain, France, the Netherlands and the United States. 
1865. With the influx of Japanese imports, artists such as Rossetti and Crane began to be influenced by Japanese objects and Ukiyo-e prints
1865. The Hong Kong and Shanghai Bank (HSBC) from Britain was established in Hong Kong.
1865. Chōshū Domain bought the warship Union from Glover and Co., an agency of Jardine Matheson established in Nagasaki, in the name of Satsuma Domain which was not against the Tokugawa shogunate then. 
1866 HSBC established a Japanese branch in Yokohama.
1867. The Icarus affair, an incident involving the murder of two British sailors in Nagasaki, leading to increased diplomatic tensions between Britain and the Tokugawa shogunate.
1868. Coup d'état by Chōshū Domain and Satsuma Domain achieved the Meiji Restoration.
1869. Audience with the Emperor Meiji in Tokyo.
1872. The Iwakura mission visited Britain as part of a diplomatic and investigative tour of the United States and Europe.
1873. The Imperial College of Engineering opened with Henry Dyer as principal.

1879 British Court for Japan was established in Yokohama.
1880. Japan government established Yokohama Specie Bank for only foreign transaction bank in Japan, with the support of HSBC.
1881. Azusa Ono suggests using the British model for the new Japanese constitution
 1886. Normanton incident British merchant vessel sinks off the coast of Wakayama Prefecture. Crew escape while 25 Japanese passengers perish. Widespread Japanese public outrage as subsequent Board of Enquiry under extraterritorial court finds the British crew not guilty. The case is later reopened, and the crew are given three month sentences. 
1885–87. Japanese exhibition at Knightsbridge, London.
1887–89. Jurist Francis Taylor Piggott, the son of ex-MP Jasper Wilson Johns, was inaugurated as a legislational consultant for Itō Hirobumi, then and the first Prime Minister of Japan.
1890. Government of Japan established the Constitution of Imperial Japan which House of Peers was not come with Universal suffrage.
1891. The Japan Society of London is founded by Arthur Diosy.
1894. The Anglo-Japanese Treaty of Commerce and Navigation was signed in London on 16 July. The treaty abolished extraterritoriality in Japan for British subjects with effect from 17 July 1899
1899.  Extraterritorial rights for British subjects in Japan came to an end.
1900. (January). Last sitting of the British Court for Japan.

20th century
1902. The Japanese–British alliance was signed in London on 30 January. It was a diplomatic milestone that saw an end to Britain's splendid isolation, and removed the need for Britain to build up its navy in the Pacific.
1905. The Japanese–British alliance was renewed and expanded. Official diplomatic relations were upgraded, with ambassadors being exchanged for the first time.
1907. In July, British thread company J. & P. Coats launched Teikoku Seishi and began to thrive.
1908. The Japan-British Society was founded in order to foster cultural and social understanding.
1909. Fushimi Sadanaru returns to Britain to convey the thanks of the Japanese government for British advice and assistance during the Russo-Japanese War.

1910. Sadanaru represents Japan at the state funeral of Edward VII, and meets the new king George V at Buckingham Palace. 
1910.  The Japan–British Exhibition is held at Shepherd's Bush in London. Japan made a successful effort to display its new status as a great power by emphasizing its new role as a colonial power in Asia.
1911. The Japanese – British alliance was renewed with approval of the dominions.
1913. The IJN Kongō, the last of the British-built warships for Japan's navy, enters service.
1914–1915.  Japan joined World War I as Britain's ally under the terms of the alliance and captured German-occupied Tsingtao (Qingdao) in China Mainland. They also help Australia and New Zealand capture archipelagos like the Marshall Islands and the Mariana Islands.
1915. The Twenty-One Demands would have given Japan varying degrees of control over all of China, and would have prohibited European powers from extending their influence in China any further. It is eventually scrapped.
1917. The Imperial Japanese Navy helps the Royal Navy and allied navies patrol the Mediterranean against Central Powers ships.
 1917–1935. Close relationships between the two country steadily worsens.
1919. Japan proposes a racial equality clause in negotiations to form the League of Nations, calling for "making no distinction, either in law or in fact, on account of their race or nationality." Britain, which supports the White Australia policy, cannot assent, and the proposal is rejected.
1921. Britain indicates it will not renew the Anglo-Japanese Alliance of 1902 primarily because of opposition from the United States and also Canada.
1921. Crown Prince Hirohito visited Britain and other Western European countries. It was the first time that a Japanese crown prince had traveled overseas.
1921. Arrival in September of the Sempill Mission in Japan, a British technical mission for the development of Japanese Aero-naval forces. It provided the Japanese with flying lessons and advice on building aircraft carriers; the British aviation experts kept close watch on Japan after that. 
1922. Washington Naval Conference concluding in the Four-Power Treaty, Five-Power Treaty, and Nine-Power Treaty; major naval disarmament for 10 years with sharp reduction of Royal Navy & Imperial Navy. The Treaties specify that the relative naval strengths of the major powers are to be UK = 5, US = 5, Japan = 3, France = 1.75, Italy = 1.75. The powers will abide by the treaty for ten years, then begin a naval arms race.
1922.
1923. The Japanese -British alliance was officially discontinued on 17 August in response to U.S. and Canadian pressure.
1930. The London disarmament conference angers Japanese Army and Navy. Japan's navy demanded parity with the United States and Britain, but was rejected; it maintained the existing ratios and Japan was required to scrap a capital ship. Extremists assassinate Japan's prime minister, and the military takes more power.
1931. September. Japanese Army seizes control of Manchuria, which China has not controlled in decades. It sets up a puppet government. Britain and France effectively control the League of Nations, which issues the Lytton Report in 1932, saying that Japan had genuine grievances, but it acted illegally in seizing the entire province. Japan quits the League, Britain takes no action. 
1934. The Royal Navy sends ships to Tokyo to take part in a naval parade in honour of the late Admiral Tōgō Heihachirō, one of Japan's greatest naval heroes, the "Nelson of the East".
1937. The Kamikaze, a prototype of the Mitsubishi Ki-15, travels from Tokyo to London, the first Japanese-built aircraft to land in Europe, for the coronation of King George VI and Queen Elizabeth.
1938 Yokohama Specie Bank acquired HSBC.
1939. The Tientsin Incident almost causes an Anglo-Japanese war when the Japanese blockade the British concession in Tientsin, China.

World War II
1941. 7/8 December.The Pacific War begins as Japan attacks British possessions in the Far East.
1941–42. In the first few months of war Japanese forces race from victory to victory. They capture Hong Kong, British Borneo, Malaya, Singapore and Burma.
The surrender of Singapore is a major defeat for the British; over hundred thousand British and Commonwealth soldiers become prisoners of war. Many British and Commonwealth POWs die in very harsh conditions of captivity.
1944. The Japanese invasion of India via Burma ends in disaster. The resulting battles of Imphal and Kohima becomes the worst defeat on land to that date in Japanese history.
1945. August. The last significant land battle of the Second World War involved British and Japanese forces. It took place in Burma – a failed Japanese breakout attempt in the Pegu Yomas.
1945. 2 September. Aboard the USS Missouri in Tokyo Bay, Admiral Bruce Fraser is among the allied commanders formally accepting the surrender of Japan.
1945–46. British troops deploy Japanese Surrendered Personnel during the First Indochina War and the Indonesian Revolution in French Indochina and the Dutch East Indies. A battalion commander, Major Kido is recommended by General Philip Christison for a DSO.

Post War
1945–1951. Japan comes under allied occupation. The British Commonwealth Force occupy the western prefectures of Shimane, Yamaguchi, Tottori, Okayama and Hiroshima and the territory of Shikoku Island. In 1951, this becomes the British Commonwealth Forces Korea with the commencement of the Korean war.
1948. The 1948 Summer Olympics was held in London. Japan did not participate.
1951. Treaty of San Francisco – the peace treaty in which Anglo-Japanese relations were normalized. The Japanese government accepts the judgements of the Tokyo War Crimes Tribunal. According to Peter Lowe, the British were still angry over the humiliation of the surrender of Singapore in 1942; resentment at American domination of the occupation of Japan; apprehension concerning renewed Japanese competition in textiles and shipbuilding; and bitterness regarding Japanese atrocities against British prisoners of war.
1953. Nineteen-year-old Crown Prince Akihito (Emperor from 1989 to 2019), represents Japan at the coronation of Queen Elizabeth II
1953. The British Council in Japan was established.
1957. Japanese Prime Minister Nobusuke Kishi decided to compensate the government of France and Banque de l'Indochine in pound sterling.
1963. The University of Oxford set Japanese as a subject in its Oriental Institute (the Sub-Faculty of East Asian Studies).
1966. The Beatles played at Nippon Budokan in Tokyo to overwhelming adulation. This performance emphasized growing good will between Britain and Japan in their foreign relations policies.
1971. HIM Emperor Hirohito pays a state visit to the United Kingdom after an interval of 50 years.
1975. Queen Elizabeth II pays a state visit to Japan.
1978. Beginning of the BET scheme (British Exchange Teaching Programme) first advocated by Nicholas MacLean.

1980s. The British-Japanese Parliamentary Group was established in Britain in the early 1980s.
1983. Naruhito (now Emperor of Japan) studied at Merton College, Oxford, until 1985, and researched transport on the River Thames.
1986. Nissan Motors began to operate its car plant in Sunderland, as Nissan Motor Manufacturing (UK) Ltd.
1986. The Prince and Princess of Wales conducted a successful royal visit.
1987. JET (Japan Exchange and Teaching) program starts when the BET scheme and the Fulbright scholarship are merged.
1988. The Daiwa Anglo-Japanese Foundation established.
1990. The Alumni Association for British JET Participants JETAA UK is established
1991. The first Sumo tournament to be held outside Japan is hosted at the Royal Albert Hall in London.
1992. Toyota Motors began to operate its car plant at Burnaston near Derby.
1993. Helen McCarthy becomes the first English-speaking author to write a book about anime, and begins cataloguing the anime fandom in the UK.
1998. Emperor Akihito pays a state visit to the United Kingdom.

21st century
2001. The year-long "Japan 2001" cultural-exchange project saw a major series of Japanese cultural, educational and sporting events held around the UK.
2001. JR West gifts a 0 Series Shinkansen (No. 22-141) to the National Railway Museum at York, she is the only one of her type to be preserved outside Japan.
2007. HIM Emperor Akihito pays his second state visit to the United Kingdom.

2011. UK sends over rescue men with rescue dogs and supplies to help the Japanese, after the 11 March 2011 Tōhoku earthquake and tsunami.
2012. A UK trade delegation to Japan, led by Prime Minister David Cameron, announces an agreement to jointly develop weapons systems.
2012. The 2012 Summer Olympics are held in London. Japan takes part for the first time, and its team comes home with 38 medals, seven of them gold.
 February 2015. Prince William, Duke of Cambridge on an official visit tours areas devastated by the 2011 Tsunami including Fukushima, Ishinomaki, and Onagawa.
 September 2016. Citing concerns for Japanese owned business operating in the United Kingdom in the wake of the European Union membership referendum, the Japanese Ministry of Foreign Affairs directly issues a 15-page memorandum on its own website requesting that the British Government strike a Brexit agreement safeguarding UK's current trading rights in the European Single Market.
 December 2018. A new trade deal between Japan and the European Union which is hoped could also act as blue-print for post-Brexit trade between Japan and the UK was approved by the European Parliament.
 September 2020. The UK and Japan agree a free trade agreement — the first made by the UK since leaving the European Union.
 June 2022. The JS Kashima made a port call in London as part of an exchange event between Japan and Britain and to commemorate the 120th anniversary of the Anglo-Japanese Alliance.
 September 2022. HIM Emperor Naruhito represents Japan at the state funeral of Queen Elizabeth II in his first visit abroad as emperor. 
 December 2022. Japan, the UK, Italy, sign an agreement to create the Global Combat Air Programme, with its first jets to be produced by 2035. The programme is about "merging the three nations' costly existing research into new aerial war technology, from stealth capacity to high-tech sensors".

Defense pacts 
 May 2022. UK Prime Minister Boris Johnson and Japanese Prime Minister Fumio Kishida meet in-person in Downing Street and sign a Reciprocal Access Agreement. The agreement, which was made in response to the Russian invasion of Ukraine and China's rise in Indo-Pacific region, seeks to expand joint military exercises and increase working together for disaster relief. It also hopes to make nations who are allies of the UK and Japan less dependent on oil and gas exported from Russia.
 January 2023. On the 11th January Japanese Prime Minister Fumio Kishida and UK Prime Minister Rishi Sunak signed a defence pact during Kishida's visit to London that will allow both nations to deploy troops in each other's countries. The UK will be the first European country to have such a reciprocal access agreement with Japan, with the UK Government describing the pact as the most important of its type since the 1902 Anglo-Japanese Alliance. The pact was signed at in at Tower London, where Prime Ministers Kishida and Sunak saw the Japanese armour given to King James VI and I in 1613 by the Shogun Tokugawa Hidetada of Japan to mark the first-ever trade agreement between the two countries. They also to discussed the UK's membership to the Comprehensive and Progressive Agreement for Trans-Pacific Partnership (CPTPP).

See also the chronology on the website of British Embassy, Tokyo.

Britons in Japan 

William Adams (Miura Anjin) - Hatamoto & Advisor to the Shogun Tokugawa Ieyasu
Arthur Adams - Zoologist who studied Japanese sealife onboard  in 1845
Rutherford Alcock - British Diplomat to Japan from 1858 - 1864 and the first 'outsider' to climb Mount Fuji in 1860
Anna d'Almeida - First Female British Travel Writer to have visited Japan in 1862, not the first known female writer on Japan however, that being the translator Mary Margaret Busk in 1841
William Anderson - A prominent collector who donated to the British Museum
Edwin Arnold - Author of The Light of Asia, visited Japan in 1889 and married Lady Tama Kurokawa
William George Aston -  Consular official and Japanologist
Matilda Chaplin Ayrton - Scholar and founder of a Midwife Hospital between 1873 - 1875 in Japan
William Edward Ayrton - Professor of Physics & Telegraphy at the Imperial College of Engineering, introduced the Arc Lamp to Japan in 1878
Michael Buckworth Bailey - First Anglican consular staff from 1862 - 1874
Thomas Baty - Legal advisor to the Japanese Empire
John Batchelor - Anglican Missionary specialist on the Ainu
Felice Beato - British/Italian/Corfiote Photographer
Edward Bickersteth - First Anglican Bishop of South Tokyo
Isabella Bird - Victorian Traveller and Author
John Reddie Black - Publisher of newspapers, principally The Far East,  which issued photos by Suzuki Shin'ichi I in 1873-4
Carmen Blacker - English Japanologist Cambridge lecturer
Thomas Blakiston - English Naturalist noted for Blakiston's Line and Blakiston's Fish Owl
Reginald Horace Blyth - Helped to introduce Zen and Haiku to the West during WWII into the 1950s, one of his students being Alan Watts
Alan Booth - Author of The Roads to Sata and a Noh enthusiast
Duncan Gordon Boyes - Winner of the Victoria Cross at Shimonoseki, 1864
Anna Brassey - An Early Traveller was Brassey in 1877
William Robert Broughton - Surveyed Eastern Honshu and Hokkaido in HMS Providence (1791) between 1795 - 1798
Richard Henry Brunton - Father of Japanese Lighthouses
Ella Du Cane - British Artist who visited in 1904
Helen Caddick - Travelled to Japan in 1893
Basil Hall Chamberlain - Translator and Prominent Japanologist
Edward Bramwell Clarke - Professor who helped introduce rugby to Japan
Richard Cocks - Head Merchant of the first British venture in Hirado from 1613 - 1623
Samuel Cocking - Yokohama Merchant
Josiah Conder - Architect known for the Rokumeikan, his books on Japanese gardening and being a pupil of Kawanabe Kyosai
Hugh Cortazzi - Japanologist and former Ambassador
James Main Dixon, former FRSE - Scottish Professor who taught Natsume Soseki
William Gray Dixon - see Land of the Morning
Archibald Douglas - Foreign Advisor to the Imperial Japanese Navy, introduced football to Japanese Naval Cadets
Christopher Dresser - Designer and major influence on the Anglo-Japanese style & Writer on Japan
Henry Dyer - First principal of the Imperial College of Engineering (Kobu Daigakko), taught Tanabe Sakuro in 1877 who designed Lake Biwa Canal which became Japan's first hydroelectric power facility
Alfred East - English watercolour artist commissioned by the Fine Art Society to paint scenes in Japan in 1889
Lord Elgin - Signatory to the British 'unequal' treaty of 1858
William Empson - Lived in Japan during the 1930s, known for The Face of the Buddha
James Alfred Ewing - Scottish Professor
Reginald Farrer - Field Botanist who lived in Tokyo in 1903
Henry Faulds - Scottish doctor who founded a hospital in Tsukiji which became the basis for St. Luke's International Hospital and helped introduce Joseph Lister's antiseptic methods to Japanese Surgeons
Hugh Fraser - British minister 1889–94
Mary Crawford Fraser - see Diplomatist's Wife in Japan
Thomas Blake Glover - Scottish trader who was key to the industrialisation of Meiji Japan, smuggled over the Choshu Five to Britain
Abel Gower - Consul
William Gowland - Father of Japanese Archaeology
Thomas Lomar Gray - Engineering Professor and Seismologist
Arthur Hasketh Groom - Creator of the first golf course in Japan
John Harington Gubbins - Diplomat to the Empire of Japan
Nicholas John Hannen - British barrister for the British Supreme Court for China and Japan from 1871 to 1900 in varying roles
Charles Holmes - Owner of the Studio Magazine, visited Japan in 1889, who along with Walter Crane were heavily influenced by Japanese aesthetics
Edward Atkinson Hornel - Scottish Artist influenced by Japanese design who visited from 1893 to 1894
Collingwood Ingram - known as "Cherry Ingram", a specialist cherry tree collector
Grace James - Japanese folklorist and children's Writer
Elizabeth Keith - Artist who visited from 1915 - 1935 intermittently, working in the Shin-hanga style
Cargill Gilston Knott - Scottish Physicist whose work in seismology led to the first earthquake hazard survey of Japan
Frank Toovey Lake – Young sailor who died aged 19 interred in Sanuki Hiroshima whose grave has been up-kept since 1868
Bernard Leach - An influential Potter whose formative years were spent in Japan
Mary Cornwall Legh - Anglican Missionary who worked with those with Leprosy
John Liggins - Anglican Missionary who landed in 1859
Arthur Lloyd - Anglican missionary notable for his work on Mahayana Buddhism
Ernest A Hart - Prominent 19th century Art collector, visited Japan in 1891 with Alice Hart 
Jan Linton - British musician active in Tokyo and Juliana's club from 1990 to 2005
Joseph Henry Longford - Consul and Academic
Claude Maxwell MacDonald - Diplomat
Ranald MacDonald - The first native English teacher in Japan
Charles Maries - English botanist sent by Veitch Nurseries who collected in Japan from 1877 - 1879
Annette Meakin - First Englishwoman to get to Japan via the Trans-Siberian Railway, also wrote about the Ainu people in 1901
John Milne - Professor and Father of Seismology
Algernon Bertram Mitford (Lord Redesdale) - Diplomat & Author of Tales of Old Japan
Edmund Morel – 'the father of Japanese railways', a foreign Advisor to the Meiji government on railways
Augustus Henry Mounsey - British Diplomat in the 1870s
Ivan Morris - Japanese Academic, translator of the Sarashina Nikki in 1971
James Murdoch - Wrote the first academic history of Japan in English
Iso Mutsu - Author of Kamakura: Fact and Legend
Edward St. John Neale, Lt.-Col, Secretary of Legation then Chargé d'Affaires 1862–1863
Mary Clarke Nind, Methodist missionary who toured Japan in May 1894
Marianne North, Victorian Traveller and Botany painter who visited in 1875
Laurence Oliphant – Secretary of the Legation in 1861
Bathia Catherine Ozaki - - Saburo Ozaki's's wife, who married in 1869 and are considered an early 'International' Japanese couple, akin to Alethea Sannomiya (m. 1874), the earliest example being Yuki Magome who married William Adams about 1605
Sherard Osborn - Visited and published in 1859 some of the first woodcut illustrations from Japan in England
Yei Theodora Ozaki - A 20th-century translator of Japanese fairy tales for children in English
Henry Spencer Palmer - Foreign Advisor on Civil Engineering for the Yokohama area and The Times correspondent
Harry Smith Parkes - Diplomat during Boshin War
Alfred Parsons - Visited and wrote of Japan from 1892 – 1895 in "Notes in Japan"
John Perry - Colleague of Ayrton at the Imperial College of Engineering, Tokyo
Charles Lennox Richardson - slain in the Namamugi Incident
Hannah Riddell - Opened the first leprosy research laboratory in Japan in 1918
Frederick Ringer - Industrialist and Nagasaki Businessman
George Bailey Sansom - Japanologist of the early 20th century
Ernest Mason Satow - Notable Diplomat and Japanologist
Timon Screech - SOAS Professor of Arts
John William Robertson Scott - Writer of The Foundations of Japan which describes rural life in WWI Japan
Alexander Allan Shand - British Banker who proposed the idea of the central bank in the 1870s
Alexander Croft Shaw - Anglican missionary
Alexander Cameron Sim - founder of Kobe Regatta & Athletic Club, introduced lemonade (Ramune) to Japan.
Admiral Sir James Stirling – Signatory to the 1854 treaty
F.W. Strange - Introduced Collegiate Rowing to Meiji Japan in 1877 at Yokohama YARC
Frederick William Sutton - Early English Photographer
Arthur Waley - First Native English Translator of The Tale of Genji
Walter Weston - Rev. who publicised the term "Japanese Alps"
William Willis - Doctor
Channing Moore Williams - Founder of Rikkyo University, he also helped to set up the Anglican Church in Japan
Ernest Henry Wilson - Plant Collector who brought 63 sakura to the West from 1911 - 1916, the  also has his namesake
Charles Wirgman - Editor of Japan Punch
Annie Yeamans - Circus performer who toured Yokohama in 1866

The chronological list of Heads of the United Kingdom Mission in Japan.

Japanese in the United Kingdom 

The family name is given in italics. Usually the family name comes first in regards to Japanese historical figures, but in modern times not
so for the likes of Kazuo Ishiguro and Katsuhiko Oku, both well known in the United Kingdom.

Aoki Shuzo - Diplomat, signed the 1894 treaty in London
HRH Arisugawa Takehito - Served with the Royal Navy and frequently visited England between 1879 and 1905
Ruth Okabe Buhicrosan (1851 - 1914) - Japanese-British published author in 1885, wife of Tannaker Buhicrosan
Uriemon Eaton - First person of Japanese descent to attend British College in 1639
Misao Gamo - Japanese socialite and diplomats wife in Edwardian Britain
Tsuneko Gauntlett - Prominent Social Rights Activist, member of the Woman's Christian Temperance Union
Genda Minoru - Naval attaché and planner of the Pearl Harbor strike; in 1940 he saw Spitfires and Bf 109s in combat over London during the Battle of Britain
Hayashi Gonsuke - Minister who promoted Japanese arts in 1894 in London
Hayashi Tadasu - A student in London from 1866 - 1868
Yuzuru Hiraga - IJN naval officer who was educated at London from 1905 - 1908, part of the design team for the famous Yamato battleship 
Taka Hirose - Bassist of the band Feeder
Hoshi Tōru - First Japanese lawyer in 1877
Inagaki Manjirō - Cambridge University graduate and diplomat
Imekanu - Ainu Yukar poet who worked with John Batchelor
Kazuo Ishiguro - Famous Writer, see The Remains of the Day
Iwakura Tomomi - see Iwakura mission especially
Shinji Kagawa - played for English football club Manchester United

Kamisaka Sekka - Studied and spread Japonisme and Art Nouveau, studied in Glasgow from 1901 - 1910
Kikuchi Dairoku - Cambridge University graduate and politician
Tatsuno Kingo - Studied under Conder and William Burges between 1877 and 1883 in Japan and England
Gunji Koizumi - Brought Judo to UK, students include Sarah Mayer, first non-Japanese woman to earn a Black belt
Kunisawa Shinkurō - Yōga painter who studied in England in the Meiji era
Yoshio Markino - Japanese Artist active in London in the first half of the 20th century
Mori Arinori - Studied at University College London in 1865 one of the Satsuma students
Naoko Mori - Actress - famous for playing Toshiko Sato in Torchwood and Doctor Who
Yoshinori Muto - Footballer for Newcastle United 
Shunsuke Nakamura - played for Scottish football club Celtic
Natsume Sōseki - Author of I Am a Cat
Utako Shimoda - Visited Britain in 1894 to study Women's Education where she was received by Queen Victoria
Teruko Sono - First female lawyer in Japan, visited in 1893 raising £155,000 to build Komatsu-juku (a girls School) opened in 1894 in Azabu
Tsuda Umeko - Leader of Women's Rights in Education who used St Hilda's College, Oxford and other British HE schools to help model a female-driven Women's University in 1902
Tetsu Yasui - Studied in Britain between 1897 and 1900, then in Wales between 1907 and 1909
Shinji Okazaki - footballer for Leicester City
Katsuhiko Oku - Oxford University rugby player, diplomat in Japanese embassy in London who died in Iraq, 2003. Posthumously promoted to ambassador. See also the Oku-Inoue fund for the children of Iraq.
Kishichiro Okura - 20th century Entrepreneur
Hisashi Owada - Cambridge University graduate, father of Princess Masako
Hiromi Marissa Ozaki - Royal College of Art Major, Artist and Designer (active 2007–present)
Rina Sawayama - 21st century Musician
Suematsu Kenchō - Cambridge University graduate and statesman
Ginnosuke Tanaka - Cambridge University graduate, introduced rugby to Japan
Tōgō Heihachirō - Spent time in the UK, one of Japan's greatest naval heroes, the "Nelson of the East"
Gnyuki Torimaru - Fashion designer (b.1937) going under his Yuki label in the 1970s-1980s, known for his jersey-drape dresses as worn by Diana to Japan in 1986
Dame Mitsuko Uchida - Classical Pianist
Uenishi Sadakazu - Bartitsu practitioner, Edith Margaret Garrud & Emily Diana Watts also practiced Suffrajitsu under his tutelage
Kawakami Sadayakko or Sada Yacco - Performed in London as Ophelia and was promoted by Ellen Terry
Will Sharpe - BAFTA Winning Actor and Director known for Giri/Haji (2019)
Maya Yoshida - footballer currently playing for Premier League club Southampton
Yamao Yōzō - Member of the Choshu Five, see also Japanese students in the United Kingdom
Prince Higashifushimi Yorihito - First member of the Japanese Royal Family  to study abroad in 1871
Diana Yukawa - Solo Violinist and Composer

Education

 In Japan
British School in Tokyo

 In the UK
Japanese School in London
Rikkyo School in England
Teikyo School United Kingdom
Chaucer College
Teikyo University of Japan in Durham
 Former institutions in the UK
Gyosei International School UK (closed)
Shi-Tennoji School in UK (closed)
Gyosei International College in the U.K. (merged into the University of Reading)

List of Japanese diplomatic envoys in the United Kingdom (partial list)

Ministers plenipotentiary
 Terashima Munenori 1872–1873
 Kagenori Ueno 1874–1879
 Mori Arinori 1880–1884
 Masataka Kawase 1884–1893
 Aoki Shūzō 1894
 Katō Takaaki 1895–1900
 Hayashi Tadasu 1900–1905

Ambassadors
 Hayashi Tadasu 1905–1906
 Komura Jutarō 1906–1908
 Katō Takaaki 2nd time, 1908–1912
 Katsunosuke Inoue 1913–1916
 Chinda Sutemi 1916–1920
 Gonsuke Hayashi 1920–1925
 Keishiro Matsui 1925–1928
 Matsudaira Tsuneo 1929–1935
 Shigeru Yoshida 1936–1938
 Mamoru Shigemitsu 1938–1941
 Shunichi Matsumoto 1952–1955
 Haruhiko Nishi 1955–1957
 Katsumi Ōno 1958–1964
 Morio Yukawa 1968–1972
 Haruki Mori 1972–?
 Masaki Orita 2001–2004
 Yoshiji Nogami 2004–2008
 Shin Ebihara 2008–2011
 Keiichi Hayashi 2011–2016
 Koji Tsuruoka 2016–present

List of ambassadors of the United Kingdom to Japan

See also 

 List of ambassadors of the United Kingdom to Japan
 History of Japanese foreign relations
 Ian Nish, historian
 Japanese entry into World War I
 British Japan Consular Service
 o-yatoi gaikokujin – foreign employees in Meiji era Japan
 Foreign cemeteries in Japan
 Japan Society of the UK
 Australia–Japan relations
 Canada–Japan relations
 China–Japan relations
 French–Japanese relations
 Germany–Japan relations
 Ireland–Japan relations
 Japan–Malaysia relations
 Japan–Netherlands relations
 Japan–New Zealand relations
 Japan–Russia relations
 Japan–Singapore relations
 Japan–South Korea relations
 Japan–United States relations
 Japanese in the United Kingdom, British people of Japanese descent
 Australia–United Kingdom relations
 Canada–United Kingdom relations
 China–United Kingdom relations
 Ireland–United Kingdom relations
 Malaysia–United Kingdom relations
 New Zealand–United Kingdom relations
 Singapore–United Kingdom relations
 South Korea–United Kingdom relations
 United Kingdom–United States relations
 Iwakura Mission, visits Europe 1871–1873
 gaikoku bugyō, commissioners of foreign affairs
 Chōshū Five, visits UK 1863
 Japanese students in the United Kingdom
 List of Westerners who visited Japan before 1868

Notes

Further reading
 The History of Anglo-Japanese Relations, 1600–2000 (5 vol.) essays by scholars. 
 Volume I: The Political-Diplomatic Dimension, 1600–1930 ed. by I. Nish and Y. Kibata. (2000) online chapter abstracts
 Volume II: The Political-Diplomatic Dimension, 1931–2000 ed by I. Nish and Y. Kibata. (2000) online chapter abstracts
Volume III: The Military Dimension ed by I. Gow et al. (2003) online chapter abstracts
 Volume IV: Economic and Business Relations ed. by J. Hunter, and S. Sugiyama.  (2002) online chapter abstracts
Volume V: Social and Cultural Perspectives ed by G. Daniels and C. Tsuzuki. (2002) online chapter abstracts
  Akagi, Roy Hidemichi. Japan's Foreign Relations 1542–1936: A Short History (1979) online 560pp
 Auslin, Michael R. Negotiating with Imperialism: The Unequal Treaties and the Culture of Japanese Diplomacy (Harvard UP, 2009). 
 Beasley, W.G. Great Britain and the Opening of Japan, 1834–1858 (1951) online
 Beasley, W. G. Japan Encounters the Barbarian: Japanese Travelers in America and Europe (Yale UP, 1995). 
 Bennett, Neville. "White Discrimination against Japan: Britain, the Dominions and the United States, 1908–1928." New Zealand Journal of Asian Studies 3 (2001): 91–105. online
 Best, Antony. "Race, monarchy, and the Anglo-Japanese alliance, 1902–1922." Social Science Japan Journal 9.2 (2006): 171–186.
 Best, Antony. British intelligence and the Japanese challenge in Asia, 1914–1941 (Palgrave Macmillan, 2002).
 Best, Antony. Britain, Japan and Pearl Harbour: Avoiding War in East Asia, 1936–1941 (1995)  excerpt and text search
 Buckley, R. Occupation Diplomacy: Britain, the United States and Japan 1945–1952 (1982) 
 Checkland, Olive. Britain's Encounter with Meiji Japan, 1868–1912 (1989).
  Checkland, Olive. Japan and Britain after 1859: Creating Cultural Bridges  (2004) excerpt and text search; online
 Britain & Japan: Biographical Portraits edited by Hugh Cortazzi Global Oriental 2004, 8 vol (1996 to 2013)
 British Envoys in Japan 1859–1972, edited and compiled by Hugh Cortazzi, Global Oriental 2004, 
 Cortazzi, Hugh, ed. Kipling's Japan: Collected Writings (1988). 
 Denney, John. Respect and Consideration: Britain in Japan 1853 – 1868 and beyond. Radiance Press (2011). 
 Dobson, Hugo and Hook, Glenn D.  Japan and Britain in the Contemporary World (Sheffield Centre for Japanese Studies/Routledge Series) (2012)  excerpt and text search; online
 Fox, Grace. Britain and Japan, 1858–1883 (Oxford UP, 1969).
 Harcreaves, J. D. "The Anglo-Japanese Alliance." History Today (1952) 2#4 pp 252–258 online
 Heere, Cees. Empire Ascendant: The British World, Race, and the Rise of Japan, 1894-1914 (Oxford UP, 2020).
 Kowner, Rotem. "'Lighter than Yellow, but not Enough': Western Discourse on the Japanese 'Race', 1854–1904." Historical Journal 43.1 (2000): 103–131. online
 Langer, William. The Diplomacy of Imperialism 1890–1902 (2nd ed. 1950), pp. pp 745–86, on treaty of 1902
 Lowe, Peter. Britain in the Far East: A Survey from 1819 to the Present (1981). 
 Lowe, Peter. Great Britain and Japan 1911–15: A Study of British Far Eastern Policy (Springer, 1969).
 McOmie, William. The Opening of Japan, 1853–1855: A Comparative Study of the American, British, Dutch and Russian Naval Expeditions to Compel the Tokugawa Shogunate to Conclude Treaties and Open Ports to their Ships (Folkestone, Kent: Global Oriental, 2006).
 McKay, Alexander. Scottish Samurai: Thomas Blake Glover, 1838–1911 (Canongate Books, 2012).
 Marder, Arthur J.  Old Friends, New Enemies: The Royal Navy and the Imperial Japanese Navy, vol. 1: Strategic illusions, 1936–1941(1981);  Old Friends, New Enemies: The Royal Navy and the Imperial Japanese Navy, vol. 2: The Pacific War, 1942–1945 (1990)
 Morley, James William, ed. Japan's foreign policy, 1868–1941: a research guide (Columbia UP, 1974), toward Britain, pp 184–235
 Nish, Ian Hill. China, Japan and 19th Century Britain (Irish University Press, 1977).
 Nish, Ian. The Anglo-Japanese Alliance: The Diplomacy of Two Island Empires 1984–1907 (A&C Black, 2013).
 Nish, Ian. Alliance in Decline: A Study of Anglo-Japanese Relations, 1908–23 (A&C Black, 2013).
 Nish, Ian. "Britain and Japan: Long-Range Images, 1900–52." Diplomacy & Statecraft (2004) 15#1 pp 149–161. 
 Nish, I., ed. Anglo-Japanese Alienation, 1919–1952 (1982),
 Nish, Ian Hill. Britain & Japan: Biographical Portraits (5 vol 1997–2004).
 O'Brien, Phillips, ed. The Anglo-Japanese Alliance, 1902–1922 (Routledge, 2004), Essays by scholars.
 Scholtz, Amelia. "The Giant in the Curio Shop: Unpacking the Cabinet in Kipling's Letters from Japan." Pacific Coast Philology 42.2 (2007): 199–216. online
 Scholtz, Amelia Catherine. Dispatches from Japanglia: Anglo-Japanese Literary Imbrication, 1880–1920. (PhD Diss. Rice University, 2012).  online
 Sterry, Lorraine. Victorian Women Travellers in Meiji Japan (Brill, 2009).
 Takeuchi, Tatsuji. War and diplomacy in the Japanese Empire (1935); a major scholarly history online free in pdf
 Thorne, Christopher G. Allies of a kind: The United States, Britain, and the war against Japan, 1941–1945 (1978)  excerpt and text search
 Thorne, Christopher. "Viscount Cecil, the Government and the Far Eastern Crisis of 1931." Historical Journal 14, no. 4 (1971): 805–26. online.
 Thorne, Christopher G. The Limits of Foreign Policy: The West, The League and the Far Eastern Crisis of 1931–1933  (1973) online free to borrow
 Towle, Phillip and Nobuko Margaret Kosuge. Britain and Japan in the Twentieth Century: One Hundred Years of Trade and Prejudice (2007)  excerpt and text search
  Woodward, Llewellyn. British Foreign Policy in the Second World War (History of the Second World War) (1962) ch 8
 Yokoi, Noriko. Japan's Postwar Economic Recovery and Anglo-Japanese Relations, 1948–1962 (Routledge, 2004).

External links
A Bibliography of Anglo-Japanese relations – at Cambridge University
The Asiatic Society of Japan – in Tokyo
The British Association for Japanese Studies
The British Consulate – in Nagoya
The British Consulate-General – in Osaka
The British Council in Japan – the cultural arm of the British government overseas
The British Chamber of Commerce in Japan
The British Embassy – in Tokyo
The British Trade Promotion Office in Fukuoka (closed June 2005)
The Cambridge & Oxford Society – founded in Tokyo in 1905
The Daiwa Anglo-Japanese Foundation – in London and Tokyo
The Embassy of Japan – in London
The Great Britain Sasakawa foundation – in London and Tokyo
The Japan Society – founded in London in 1891
The Japan-British Society – founded in Japan in 1908
Japan-U.K. Relations at Japan's Ministry of Foreign Affairs Official Website.
JETAA UK Japan Exchange and Teaching Programme Alumni Association United Kingdom

 
United Kingdom
Bilateral relations of the United Kingdom